Caroline Marsh Watts (1868–1919) was a British painter. She was born in Handsworth, now part of Birmingham, and died at Colehill in Dorset.

Life

Caroline Watts was the youngest child of Robert Watts. He manufactured buttons in Handsworth up to the year 1891, when he retired and moved to St Margarets in the Twickenham area with his youngest children. Caroline Watts studied at the Slade School of Fine Art in London. Upon their father's death in 1894, Watts and her sister Mary moved to Pimlico. In the 1901 census, the sisters stated Mary's occupation was compiler of indexes, while Caroline worked as a painter.

The first illustrations that can be traced back to her were drawn from 1899 on. Some depict the  King Arthur legend, while others were drawn for various historical novels written by Jessie Weston and published by Alfred Nutt. Upon Nutt's death, his wife M. L. Nutt, an involved women's rights activist, took over the publishing house. Under her watch, various suffragette works were published. It is therefore assumed that she put Watts in touch with the women's right activists.

In 1908, Watts created the Artists' Suffrage League's promotional poster Bugler Girl for the National Union of Women's Suffrage Societies' June demonstrations. The motif was thereafter made the logo of the suffragette newspaper and was copied frequently. It was also borrowed by the Women's suffrage in the United States movement and recoloured in purple, white and green.

Watts and her sister lived in Godalming in 1911 and had moved to Colehill, Dorset by 1918.

Selection of book illustrations
 Gottfried von Straßburg: The Story of Tristan and Iseult. Translated from the German by Jessie L. Weston. Illustrations by Caroline Watts. 1899
 Guingamor, Launfal, Tyolet, The were-wolf. Translated from the French by Jessie Laidley Weston. Illustrations by Caroline Watts. Nutt, London. 1900
 Marie de France: Seven of her Lays. Translated from the French by Edith Rickert. Illustrations by Caroline Watts. Nutt, London. 1901
 Arthur Herbert Leahy (Publisher): The Courtship of Ferb : an old Irish romance ; transcribed in the twelfth century into the Book of Leinster. Illustrations by Caroline Watts. Nutt, London. 1902
 Sir Cleges ; Sir Libeaus Desconus: two old English metrical romances. Prose by Jessie L. Weston. Illustrations by Caroline Watts. Nutt, London. 1902
 Samuel Taylor Coleridge: Christabel. Illustrations by Caroline Watts. J.M. Dent, London. 1904
 Sir Gawain at the Grail Castle. Translated from the French by Jessie L. Weston. Illustrations by Caroline Watts. 1904
 Katharine Tynan: The wild harp: a selection from Irish poetry. Illustrations by Caroline Watts. London. 1913

References

External links 
 
 
 Caroline Watts on Artblogs
 

1868 births
1919 deaths
19th-century English painters
20th-century English painters
19th-century English women artists
20th-century English women artists
Alumni of the Slade School of Fine Art
Artists from Birmingham, West Midlands
English illustrators
English suffragettes
People from Handsworth, West Midlands